Borodino is a town in Krasnoyarsk Krai, Russia, located  northeast of Krasnoyarsk, the administrative center of the krai. Population:

History
It was founded in 1949 as a coal miners' settlement. Town status was granted to it in 1981.

Administrative and municipal status
Within the framework of administrative divisions, it is incorporated as the krai town of Borodino—an administrative unit with the status equal to that of the districts. As a municipal division, the krai town of Borodino is incorporated as Borodino Urban Okrug.

References

Notes

Sources

External links
Official website of Borodino 
Borodino Business Directory 

Cities and towns in Krasnoyarsk Krai
Cities and towns built in the Soviet Union
Populated places established in 1949